Zolani Petelo (born 21 September 1975) is a South African former professional boxer who competed from 1993 to 2005. He held the IBF mini-flyweight title from 1997 to 2000 and challenged for the IBF junior-flyweight title in 2001.

Professional career

Petelo turned professional in 1993, and accumulated a record of 10–2–2 before receiving his first shot at a world title in 1997.

Mini-flyweight
As a significant underdog, Petelo scored a fourth-round knockout over long reigning IBF mini-flyweight champion, Ratanapol Sor Vorapin, ending the champion's streak of 20 consecutive title fight victories. Petelo successfully defended his title five times against challengers Faisol Akbar, Carmelo Caceres, Eric Jamili, Juanito Rubillar, and Mickey Cantwell. He vacated the title in 2001 in order to move up in weight.

Junior-flyweight
On 29 September 2001, he unsuccessfully challenged IBF junior-flyweight champion, Ricardo López, losing by eighth-round knockout.

Retirement
Following the loss to Lopez, Petelo remained inactive for the following three and a half years. In 2005, he returned to the ring against former IBO champion Zolile Mbityi, losing a closely contested eight-round majority decision. After suffering another decision loss, Petelo retired from the sport of boxing.

Professional boxing record

See also
List of Mini-flyweight boxing champions

References

External links

1975 births
Living people
People from Ibhayi
Xhosa people
South African male boxers
Mini-flyweight boxers
Light-flyweight boxers
World mini-flyweight boxing champions
International Boxing Federation champions
Sportspeople from the Eastern Cape